Agnes Gilmour Kent-Johnston  (27 September 1893 – 10 March 1981) was a New Zealand community leader and broadcaster. She was born in Killearn, Stirlingshire, Scotland, on 27 September 1893. She was appointed a Member of the Order of the British Empire in the 1946 New Year Honours.

References

1893 births
1981 deaths
Scottish emigrants to New Zealand
New Zealand radio presenters
New Zealand women radio presenters
New Zealand Members of the Order of the British Empire